Little India MRT station is an underground Mass Rapid Transit (MRT) interchange station on the North East (NEL) and Downtown (DTL) lines. The station is located at the junction of Bukit Timah Road and Race Course Road, on the boundary of the planning areas of Kallang and Rochor, Singapore.

The station serves the ethnic neighbourhood of Little India, and is within walking distances to key locations such as KK Women's and Children's Hospital, Tekka Market, and the Land Transport Authority (LTA) headquarters. Opening on 20 June 2003 as part of the NEL, it later became an interchange station with the DTL when Stage 2 of the line started operations on 27 December 2015.

History

North East line

The station was first announced as "Kandang Kerbau" when the North East line stations were revealed on 6 March 1996. The announcement of the station was 'greatly welcomed' by the residents and shopkeepers in Little India, who hoped that the station will give the Little India district a 'new lease of life' with more developments around the station. Contract 706 for the design and construction of Kandang Kerbau station was awarded to a joint venture between Hyundai Engineering & Construction and Zublin AG at S$311.56 million (US$ million) in April 1997. The contract also includes the construction of the adjacent Farrer Park station.

During the construction, on 7 October 1998, construction workers at the site unearthed human skeletons, alongside discoveries of gold, jewellery, coins and weapons such as machine guns and ammunition. Widely speculated to be massacred victims during the Japanese occupation, the exact origins of the remains remained unknown.

To facilitate the construction, Buffalo Lane, which connects shoppers to the nearby Tekka Centre, was set to be closed. However, the Moulmein Tekka Residents' Committee was concerned that the closure of the road will create inconvenience and road congestion around the station site. Eventually, a metal decking on the road was constructed to allow the public to utilise the road to access Tekka Centre as construction works continued underneath the decking. Although a simple solution, the road decking was needed to be shifted around five times during the construction. As the deck took up a notable amount of space at the worksite, the construction schedule has to be reworked which cost the Land Transport Authority (LTA) about $1 million (US$ million).

Another challenge faced was the construction of the  underpass from the station to the opposite side of Bukit Timah Road underneath the Bukit Timah Canal. It was initially considered to use the conventional cut-and-cover method to construct the underpass but there were a few problems with the method. The method would involve disrupting the vehicular traffic on Bukit Timah Road, and obstructing the water flow of the canal, which could potentially lead to the flooding of the road, the station and the tunnels. An alternative method – the open-face tunnelling method used by miners – was then employed and was proven successful, without the need to disrupt the traffic on Bukit Timah Road.

The station eventually opened on 20 June 2003 as Little India station. The station name change was opposed by the Singapore Heritage Society, which claimed that the new name was 'misleading', suggesting that the area was the 'main abode of Indians'. They had advocated keeping the name "Kandang Kerbau", which means 'buffalo shed' in Malay, as it best reflects the area's heritage.

Downtown line

The DTL station was first announced as part of DTL2 (Downtown line Stage 2) on 15 July 2008. The contract also included the construction of the adjacent Rochor station. Construction of the station was scheduled to commence in the third quarter of 2009 and targeted to be completed by 2015.

The construction of the DTL station involves navigating through the large boulders underground. A  section of the DTL tunnel below the NEL tunnels have to be manually mined due to the hard ground and the huge boulders. A boulder the size of a double-decker bus was also broken into smaller pieces using specialised hydraulic machinery during the construction. The station opened on 27 December 2015 along with the other DTL Stage 2 stations.

Incidents
On 20 December 2012, train services on the North East line was delayed due to a train fault. A statement from SBS Transit said there was no train service between Punggol and Little India due to a train fault. Free bus rides were made available at designated bus stops near affected NEL stations. At about 5.18 pm, all train services resumed. SBS Transit has apologised for the inconvenience caused.

On 24 April 2013, a woman known only as Madam Ong had her leg trapped in the gap between the station platform and the train, saying that she was pushed. She suffered minor injuries.

No one was injured in a fire that broke out at a Downtown line worksite along Race Course Road on the evening of 26 March 2014. The Land Transport Authority (LTA) told Yahoo Singapore that a "small fire" had broken out at a "localised area" within the worksite of the Downtown line Little India MRT station. "There is also no impact to DTL2 construction progress," added a spokesperson for the LTA, who added that the fire was put out by 10pm, after it first broke out about half an hour earlier.

Art in Transit
The artwork featured in the North East line section features Memoirs of the Past by S. Chandrasekaran. The animal paintings echos the past of Little India when buffalo stables were seen.

The Downtown line section features "Woven Field" by Grace Tan. It features a landscape of tessellated triangular configurations inspired by the singhaulia woven patterns commonly seen in the traditional sari.

References

External links
 

Railway stations in Singapore opened in 2003
Kallang
Rochor
Mass Rapid Transit (Singapore) stations